The Fifteenth Canadian Ministry was the cabinet chaired by Prime Minister R. B. Bennett.  It governed Canada from 7 August 1930 to 23 October 1935, including only the 17th Canadian Parliament.  The government was formed by the old Conservative Party of Canada.

Ministers

References

Succession

15
Ministries of George V
1930 establishments in Canada
1935 disestablishments in Canada
Cabinets established in 1930
Cabinets disestablished in 1935